Tonny van Leeuwen (21 March 1943 – 15 June 1971) was a Dutch footballer. He played in two matches for the Netherlands national football team in 1967.

References

1943 births
1971 deaths
Dutch footballers
Netherlands international footballers
Place of birth missing
Association footballers not categorized by position